2.01 (GRAU index serial number 11F35 3K) is the designation of the third Buran-class orbiter to be produced as part of the Soviet/Russian Buran programme. Its construction was not complete when the Buran programme was cancelled (30–50 percent done), so it remains unfinished.  It was never officially named.

Differences from Buran and Ptichka
The 2.01 is the first of a second series of Buran-class orbiters. The design was improved using feedback from the earlier models of Buran-class shuttles, such as the flight of Buran and the construction of Ptichka.

Major changes include:
Hull design optimized to save weight. 
Thermal protection system arrangement changed. 
Spoilers added to elevons.
OMS thrusters configuration changed.
Payload bay doors radiator design simplified.
Landing gear improved. 
 Drag chute container was reduced, since it turned out the surface area of the parachutes in the flight of Buran was overabundant.

After the Challenger disaster it was decided to limit the crew capacity of the second series of orbiters to four crew members with ejection seats regularly mounted.

Since none of the second series orbiters were completed, only changes in the thermal protection system and OMS thrusters arrangement can be visible on 2.01.

History

Projected flights 
It was projected in 1989 that orbiter 2.01 would have its first manned space test flight, 3K1, in 1994, with a duration of twenty-four hours. The craft would have been equipped with a life support system and two ejection seats. Crew would have consisted of two cosmonauts — Igor Volk (commander) and Aleksandr Ivanchenko (flight engineer).

In 1991, construction of the orbiter was suspended, and in 1993, the Buran program was completely cancelled.

Post-retirement 

After residing at the Tushino factory where it was constructed, it was incorrectly announced in 2006 that orbiter 2.01 would be put on display in the Technik Museum Speyer, Germany. However, the German Museum had actually bought OK-GLI, the jet-powered Buran atmospheric test vehicle, which appeared on display in its own new hangar from September 2008.

From 2004 the orbiter 2.01 was left under open skies at a car park in Moscow, near Khimki Reservoir.

On 22 June 2011, during the day the orbiter was put on a barge to be moved to the MAKS 2011 international air show, which took place from 16 to 21 August in Zhukovsky (Moscow region). In the night of 22–23 June, it was seen on the Moskva River. The orbiter was exposed at the show with one side restored.

In 2012, it was seen during the Russian Air Force 100th Anniversary Airshow in Zhukovsky. It was expected that it would be restored in Zhukovsky and shown at the MAKS 2013 exhibition, but it never appeared at the exhibition. , it remained at the Zhukovsky International Airport 

In July 2017, heat-tiles from orbiter 2.01 were listed online, leading some to believe that the orbiter had been scrapped or otherwise disassembled. However, satellite imagery of Zhukovsky Airport taken in 2019 indicates that 2.01 still resides at the airfield, albeit now in a different location 

As of 22 April 2022, the orbiter appears to have been moved to Voenfilm-Medyn cinema complex where it resides currently (August 2022). According to the video shown below, coordinates should be 54,9504486, 35,8559756.  Satellite imagery still shows 2.01 located in Zhukovsky Airport.

See also 

 Buran (spacecraft) – Buran Spacecraft OK-1.01
 Buran program
 OK-GLI – Buran Analog BST-02 test vehicle
 Mikoyan-Gurevich MiG-105 – Soviet orbital spaceplane
 Space Shuttle program (United States)
 MAKS (spacecraft)
 Space exploration
 Space accidents and incidents
 N1 (rocket)
 Tupolev OOS

References

External links 

 2.01 orbiter
 2.01 status incorrectly mentioning its relocation to Germany 
 Images of 2.01 parked open air in Moscow in 2004 with a notice it's being moved to NPO Molniya

Buran-class orbiters
Cancelled Soviet spacecraft